Elisabeth of Görlitz (1390 or 1380 – 1444 or 2 August 1451) reigned as Duchess of Luxemburg from 1411 to 1443.

Life
Elisabeth was the only daughter and heiress of John of Görlitz, the third son of Charles IV, Holy Roman Emperor. He was Duke of Lusatia and Görlitz, and also Elector of Brandenburg for a brief period. Her mother, Richardis Catherine of Sweden, was the daughter of King Albert of Sweden.

Reign
The Duchy of Luxemburg was mortgaged to Elisabeth by her uncle the King Sigismund of Hungary, who later also became King of Bohemia and Holy Roman Emperor. He was unable to repay the loan, and subsequently left Elisabeth in control of the duchy.

Her first marriage took place in Brussels on 16 July 1409, to Antoine, Duke of Brabant. He defended her against three uprisings of the Luxemburgian nobility, until his death in 1415.

John III, Duke of Bavaria, was her second husband. He died in 1425, and they did not have any children. After his death, she became heavily indebted.

Deposition
In 1441, she made a treaty with Philip III, Duke of Burgundy, allowing him to immediately assume the administrative duties of Luxemburg and inherit the duchy upon her death. He agreed to this, but chose to launch a night attack on the territory two years later, taking immediate control. Elisabeth was subsequently expelled from Luxemburg by Philip's forces.

Issue
William (2 June 1410 – 10 July 1410, Brussels)
unknown (1413)

Further reading
 Joseph Calmette. Die großen Herzöge von Burgund. Callwey Verlag, München 1963; Eugen Diederichs Verlag, Munich 1996, 
 Michael Erbe. Belgien – Niederlande – Luxemburg – Geschichte des niederländischen Raumes. Kohlhammer Verlag, Stuttgart 1993, 
 Jörg K. Hoensch. Die Luxemburger – Eine spätmittelalterliche Dynastie gesamteuropäischer Bedeutung 1308–1437. Kohlhammer Verlag, Stuttgart 2000, 
 Jörg K. Hoensch. Kaiser Sigismund – Herrscher an der Schwelle zur Neuzeit 1368–1437. C. H. Beck, Munich 1996,

References 

|-

1390 births
1451 deaths
People from Hořovice
People from the Kingdom of Bohemia
House of Luxembourg
Dukes of Luxembourg
Duchesses of Brabant
Duchesses of Limburg
Remarried royal consorts